An oostegite is a large, flexible plate-like flap extending medially from the coxae (first segments) of the pereiopods (thoracic appendages) in some female crustaceans. It forms part of the marsupium or brood pouch of members of the superorder Peracarida, from the class Malacostraca (crabs, shrimps, woodlice and others).

References

Arthropod morphology